Lebyazhye is a rural locality on Karelian Isthmus, in Vyborgsky District of Leningrad Oblast.

Rural localities in Leningrad Oblast
Karelian Isthmus